Peristoreus fulvus is a species of true weevil. It is endemic to New Zealand. It is associated with plants of the genus Muehlenbeckia.

P. fulvus was originally named Erirhinus fulvus by Broun in 1886. Then, in 1926, Marshall described a new genus called Dorytomodes, into which he provisionally transferred all species placed by Broun in Erirrhinus [=Erirhinus]. Dorytomodes was subsequently sunk as a synonym of Peristoreus by Edward S. ("Ted") Gourlay in 1950.

References

External links
 NatureWatch NZ

Beetles of New Zealand
Curculioninae
Beetles described in 1886
Endemic insects of New Zealand
Endemic fauna of New Zealand